Volleyball 1on1 is an interactive Volleyball website that was founded by  former NCAA volleyball champion and businessman Andor Gyulai and entrepreneur and finance expert Vanessa Summers in March 2009. The website is a resource for instructional volleyball videos, drills, practice plans as well containing an extensive online volleyball store. The site showcases in excess of 1,000 volleyball videos featuring coaching and instruction from former AVP tour professionals in addition to well known volleyball coaches and FIVB professionals.

The main function of volleyball1on1.com is as a pay website that brings exclusive content in the form of instructional volleyball videos to the consumer. These instructional volleyball videos feature step by step coaching on volleyball techniques from professionals such as Eric Fonoimoana, Jeff Nygaard,  Stein Metzger, Anthony Medel, Seth Burnham, Logan Tom and more. The site also has association with several affiliate sites that specialize in volleyball resources such as findavolleyballclub.com, vbvolleyball.com, and indoorvolleyballs.com.

References

External links
Volleyball1on1.com Homepage
Volleyball Videos
Eric Fonoimoana Volleyball Videos
Logan Tom Volleyball Videos
Jeff Nygaard Volleyball Videos

Volleyball websites